Aidan Ryan may refer to:

Sportspeople
 Aidan Ryan (Cork hurler) (born 1986), Irish hurler
 Aidan Ryan (Tipperary hurler) (born 1965), Irish hurler

Others
 Aidan Ryan (poet)